Brown thrush may refer to:

 Brown-headed thrush (Turdus chrysolaus)
 Brown thrasher (Toxostoma rufum)